Renmark may refer to.

Renmark, South Australia, a town and locality in South Australia
Renmark Airport, an airport in South Australia
Renmark Pioneer, a former newspaper in South Australia which now trades as the Murray Pioneer
Town of Renmark, a former local government area in South Australia which was merged to create the Renmark Paringa Council

See also
Renmark Rovers Football Club